The governor of Davao de Oro is the local chief executive of the Philippine province of Davao de Oro.

Davao de Oro, originally named Compostela Valley, was carved out of Davao del Norte in 1998. Davao del Norte's governor, Rommel Amatong, chose to be the new province's governor after voters approved its creation via a plebiscite. He then resigned a day after he assumed office, in order to run as representative. Luz Sarmiento, the wife of Davao del Norte representative Lorenzo Sarmiento, was appointed as governor until the first elections were held later that year. Jose Caballero was the first person to be elected as governor in 1998.

After being term limited in 2007, Arturo Uy was then elected. After he was term limited himself in 2016, his son, Jayvee Uy, was elected. In 2019, Compostela Valley was renamed into "Davao de Oro" after another plebiscite.

References

 
1998 establishments in the Philippines
Governors of provinces of the Philippines